Malcolm Rudolph (born 4 January 1989) is an Australian former professional racing cyclist.

Major results

2009
 1st Stage 1 (TTT) Tour de Singkarak
 5th Road race, Oceania Road Championships
2010
 2nd Road race, National Under-23 Road Championships
2011
 6th Road race, Oceania Road Championships
2015
 7th Road race, Oceania Road Championships

References

External links

1989 births
Living people
Australian male cyclists
People from Maryborough, Queensland